This is a discography for the Canadian rock guitarist Rik Emmett.

Discography

Studio albums

Live albums

Video

External links
 Rik Emmett official site

 
Discographies of Canadian artists
Rock music discographies